Tsamai may refer to:

Tsamai language
Tsamai people